Thihathura II of Ava (February 1474 – 4 March 1501) was the joint-king of Ava who co-reigned with his father Minkhaung II for 15 years. When he was just six, his father ascended to the Ava throne and he was made heir-apparent. In 1485, the 11-year-old was made a co-regent. He lived in the same palace with his father, and displayed a white umbrella as a symbol of sovereignty. He co-ruled with his father for 15 years but died a month earlier than his father. Minkhaung, who faced numerous rebellions throughout his reign, made his son joint-king because he wanted to retain loyalty of his son. Minkhaung outlived his son, died in March 1501 and was succeeded by his younger son Shwenankyawshin (Narapati II).

Notes

References

Bibliography
 
 
 

Ava dynasty
1474 births
1501 deaths
15th-century Burmese monarchs